Samuel A. Maple (July 18, 1953 - November 13, 2001) was an American jockey in Thoroughbred horse racing.

Born in Carrollton, Ohio, Sam Maple was one of eight brothers and sisters. His older brother, Eddie, was also a jockey. He began his professional riding career in 1969 in his native Ohio at Thistledown Racecourse in North Randall where he got the first of his more than 2,500 career race wins. He would go on to compete at various tracks across the United States, earning wins in major races such as the Travers Stakes. In 1979, he rode Smarten to wins in four Derbys, capturing the American, Illinois, Ohio, and Pennsylvania Derbys.

In 1979, Maple was the regular jockey on Smart Angle, who earned American Champion Two-Year-Old Filly honors. On April 18, 1984, Maple set the Oaklawn Park track record for a mile and a sixteenth in winning the Apple Blossom Handicap aboard Heatherten.

In 1988, Maple was diagnosed as having a brain tumor. He underwent surgery and returned to racing in April of the following year. In late August 1990, he was involved in a racing accident at Louisiana Downs that broke both of his legs and kept him out of racing for several months. On September 11, 1993, Maple earned his 2,500th career win in the second race at Turfway Park aboard Corvus.

Maple earned his last win at Churchill Downs in November 1995. After only a few rides in 1996, he retired from the sport. He and his family had made their home in Louisville, Kentucky in the early 1990s but in the fall of 2001 they moved to Wilmore, Kentucky, where he succumbed to his cancer at age forty-eight on November 13. He was survived by his wife Jill and their four children.

References
 February 1, 1990 article in the Sacramento Bee titled Family Comes First, So Jockey Maple Moves On
 November 13, 2001 Thoroughbred Times article titled Former jockey Sam Maple dead at 48
 November 24, 2001 ESPN article on Sam Maple

1953 births
2001 deaths
Deaths from brain cancer in the United States
American jockeys
People from Carrollton, Ohio
Jockeys from Louisville, Kentucky